The Copa del Centenario de la Batalla de Boyacá was the second official tournament in the history of the Colombian football, organized to commemorate 100 years since the Battle of Boyacá. The format of the tournament was similar to the 1918 Campeonato Nacional format, because it was played only between teams from the same city: Cali. This tournament was divided in two groups, each group having three teams with only one champion.

Copa de Menores 1919 

The first tournament was disputed on August 3, 1919. All the matches were disputed the same day.

Teams:

 América F.C.
 Latino del Valle
 Ayacucho Cali

First Round

Final

Senior Cup

The second tournament was disputed on August 7, 1919. All the matches were disputed the same day.

Teams:
 Hispania de Cali
 Valle F.C.
 Palmira XI

First Round

Final

References 

1919
Col
1919 in Colombia